The 1965 County Championship was the 66th officially organised running of the County Championship. Worcestershire won their second consecutive Championship title.

On 19 and 20 May 1965, the match between Yorkshire and Hampshire, Yorkshire were bowled out for 23 runs in their second innings, their lowest ever first-class total.

Table
10 points for a win
5 points to each side for a tie
5 points to side still batting in a match in which scores finish level
2 points for first innings lead in a match drawn or lost
1 point for first innings tie in a match lost
If no play possible on the first two days, and the match does not go into the second innings, the side leading on first innings scores 6 points. If the scores are level, the side batting second scores 3 points.
Position determined by points gained. If equal, then decided on most wins.
Each team plays 28 matches.

 Note: Surrey record includes six points for first innings lead in match restricted by weather to last third of time allotted.

References

1965 in English cricket
County Championship seasons